Raymond Arrieta (born March 26, 1965) is a Puerto Rican actor, comedian, host and philanthropist. Starting his career as a comedian in various local shows, Arrieta gained popularity in the 1990s when he hosted a string of successful comedy shows where he showcased his various characters and personifications. Since 2007, Arrieta has been hosting the mid-day variety show Día a Día, along with Dagmar. Arrieta is also a radio show host and a theater actor.

Arrieta has gained prominence for his philanthropic endeavors. After his friend and co-host, Dagmar, was diagnosed with cancer in 2008, Arrieta has performed a yearly charity walk around various parts of the island while also raising awareness. Because of his commitment to the cause, Arrieta has received numerous recognitions, including from the Senate of Puerto Rico.

Early years

Raymond Arrieta was born as Ramón Emilio Arrieta Vázquez in Hato Rey, one of the main barrios of San Juan, Puerto Rico. His parents were Ramón Arrieta and Carmín Vázquez. Arrieta went to school at the Academy Nuestra Señora de la Providencia. When he was in the third grade, Arrieta volunteered to play the part of "Ramoneta Cienfuegos", a character of popular Puerto Rican comedian Shorty Castro, in a school play. After that he continued to participate in many other plays at school, even organizing his own. One of the works he wrote and directed was Mundo Loco, which told a story about a war between fans of Salsa music and fans Rock music. Arrieta has mentioned that José Miguel Agrelot has always been his main inspiration.

After Arrieta graduated from high school, he enrolled in the Universidad del Sagrado Corazón of San Juan, where he earned a bachelor's degree in Radio and Television Production in 1987. There, he also joined Phi Sigma Alpha fraternity.

On one occasion, Arrieta and some friends visited the café theater "El Punto del Coquí" located in Old San Juan. He sat down and played the piano while doing imitations. The owner of the club was impressed and asked Arrieta to prepare an act for his club. Arrieta prepared an act called "Black and White" which was a success and he was soon traveling around the island with his "show". In 1983, Our Lady of the Providence Academy established the "Raymond Arrieta Award" which is annually awarded to the student with the best artistic qualities.

Career as a comedian
In 1988, Arrieta already had his own radio show and was also participating in Telemundo's "Estudio Alegre" (Happy Studio);"El Show del Medio Día" (The Noon Show) for WAPA among others. He landed a role in the Spanish version of the play "The Diary of Anne Frank".

In 1991, Arrieta went to Mexico where he participated in the play "Mama ama el Rock" (Mother loves Rock) with Mexican stars Angelica María and Angélica Vale. In 1995, he replaced George Ortuzar as the host of Lente Loco (Crazy Lens), a Candid Camera-style show, co-hosting with Cuban model Odalys García.

Later in the nineties, he had his own show "Que Vacilón" which aired in prime time through WAPA. In this comedy show of sketches and stand-ups, he brought to life, along with other local talents, which also included Rene Monclova, Jorge Castro, and Tita Guerrero, a bunch of peculiar characters who gained immense popularity in the Puerto Rican pop culture, like the clown Trompetilla, a grumpy clown with a kind of fraudulent circus; and Andresito a kind of Dennis the Menace little boy. Many consider this period to be the peak of his career.

Arrieta had his own weekly TV show in Puerto Rico called "El Show de Raymond". Which was transmitted through Televicentro and WAPA TV. In 2007 he switched to Telemundo and WKAQ-TV, where he currently stars in his own daytime daily show, "Día a Día con Raymond y Dagmar". Puerto Rican comedian, José Miguel Agrelot once said, that Raymond Arrieta was the greatest comedian of the "new" generation.

In 2014, Raymond returned to comedy television with the WKAQ-TV sketch comedy "Raymond y sus Amigos", which also reunites him with "Que Vacilon" cast members Monclova and Castro.

Da Vida Caminando con Raymond (Walk-A-Thon)

On Friday, May 15, 2009 Arrieta began a Walk-A-Thon to raise funds for cancer patients in Puerto Rican institutions, the city of Ponce to San Juan arriving in Telemundo Puerto Rico. The Walk-A-Thon which ended on May 19, 2009. This hike was named the 2nd Hike Ramón Rivero "Diplo," the first man to hold a walka-a-thon in the world to raise funds for a cause, in 1953—for the Oncological Hospital, in San Juan.  On October 23, 2009 Fi Sigma Alfa honored Raymond Arrieta by bestowing upon him the "Medalla de Caballero Sigma" a medal only four other members have been honored with.

Arrieta walked again for cancer patients in 2010 from Aguadilla to San Juan arriving in Telemundo Puerto Rico with the name "Da Vida Caminando con Raymond". On June 4, 2010, on the very morning of the start of the Walk-A-Thon, Caguas mayor, William Miranda Marín died from pancreatic cancer. The 2010 edition of the Walk-A-Thon was dedicated to "Willie" first thing in the morning after in 2009 the Walk-A-Thon passed by through Caguas and he told Arrieta he would participate again the next year.

In 2011, Raymond walked for a third time from Vieques to San Juan in six days and raised money for the Puerto Rico Oncologist Hospital patients, which had no money to pay employees or. He walked 12 miles through the island of Vieques, then boarded a ferry back to Fajardo and continued to walk in a treadmill completing 2 miles in about an hour and a half. After reaching Fajardo everyone rested for the next day. In 3 days he reached San Juan, near the facilities of Telemundo. However, before arriving to San Juan, he followed the route which led to Caguas and he attended a memorial service held in honor of the memory of the late Caguas mayor William Miranda Marín, at the Caguas Botanical Garden,  As stated before, Miranda Marín died on June 4, 2010, the first day of Arrieta's Walk-A-Thon from Mayagüez. The Walk-A-Thon continued to Río Piedras, then back to San Juan. The goal for this fund-raiser was $1 Million and, according to statistics, a record has been set with an unknown quantity of money at the moment. The route he completed was Vieques-Fajardo, Fajardo-Río Grande, Río Grande-San Juan, San Juan-Caguas, Caguas-Río Piedras and Río Piedras-San Juan.

Comedy Characters

Filmography

Source

Notes

See also

 List of Puerto Ricans
 List of television presenters/Puerto Rico

References

External links
 Popular Culture
 Spanish Biography of Raymond
 
 

1965 births
Living people
20th-century Puerto Rican male actors
21st-century Puerto Rican male actors
Male actors from San Juan, Puerto Rico
Puerto Rican comedians
Puerto Rican male television actors
Puerto Rican philanthropists
Puerto Rican television personalities
Puerto Rican television talk show hosts
Universidad del Sagrado Corazón alumni